The Generation Game is a British game show produced by the BBC in which four teams of two people from the same family, but different generations, compete to win prizes.

The game
There are eight competitors, hence the catchphrase "Let's meet the eight who are going to generate" used in earlier series by Bruce Forsyth. The couples were a generation apart and in later series, but not originally, of different genders. Most of the time it was mother/son, father/daughter. Sometimes aunt/nephew and uncle/niece played. In the first two rounds, two couples compete against each other in two games. One game usually involves first seeing a skilled professional construct or perform something, such as pottery or dancing. The contestants attempt to do the same, and a score is given by the professional. The other game usually involves more of a quiz element, such as identifying pieces of music. At the end of each of the first two rounds, the couple with the lower score is eliminated.

The two highest-scoring couples compete against each other in the final (or End Game as Larry Grayson called it). This is often a big set-piece performance; in the series presented by Bruce Forsyth it was usually a drama or farce, in later programmes a musical or dance performance. The couple that scores the highest go through to the final 'conveyor belt'. Originally, this was scored the same way in the first rounds, but when Davidson took over, the winner was decided by an audience vote.

At the end of the show, one member (both members during the second Forsyth era) of the victorious team watches prizes pass on a conveyor belt, and wins as many as could be recalled in 45 seconds (20 seconds per teammate during the second Forsyth era), with some items awarding a bonus prize if the contestant or team recalls that item. A trademark of the show is that a cuddly toy is always among the prizes. This led to an affectionate joke: "Dinner service...fondue set...Cuddly toy! Cuddly toy!", which is sometimes quoted when the show is mentioned. The audience and the host shout out the names of the prizes, especially in later series, allowing the contestants to carry away large numbers of items. Towards the end of the Davidson run, an added twist involved four prizes being referred to as "phantom prizes", if the contestant was to mention those, gunge would be hurled at them every time one was recalled.

In the Davidson run, if contestants correctly recalled 15 of the 20 prizes in 45 (later 60) seconds, they won everything and a bonus prize, usually a holiday. In series 6, each point scored by the winning team became one second.

History

1971–1977: Origins and first Bruce Forsyth era
The show is based on the Dutch TV show Één van de acht ("One of the Eight"), the format devised in 1969 by Theo Uittenbogaard for VARA Television. Mies Bouwman, a Dutch talk show host and presenter of the show, came up with the idea of the conveyor belt. She had seen it on a German programme and wanted to incorporate it into the show.

Another antecedent for the game show was Sunday Night at the London Palladium on ATV, which had a game called Beat the Clock, taken from an American game show of the same name. It featured married couples playing silly games within a certain time to win prize money. This was hosted by Bruce Forsyth from 1958, and he took the idea with him when he went over to the BBC.

During the 1970s, game shows became more popular and started to replace expensive variety shows. Creating new studio shows was cheaper than hiring a theatre and paying for long rehearsals and a large orchestra, and could secure a similar number of viewers. With less money for their own productions, a game show seemed the obvious idea for ITV. As a result, many variety performers were recruited for game shows. The BBC, suffering poor ratings, decided to make its own game show. Bill Cotton, the BBC's Head of Light Entertainment, believed that Forsyth was best for the job. For years, The Generation Game was one of the strongest shows in the BBC's Saturday night line-up, and became the number-one game show on British television during the 1970s, regularly gaining over 21 million viewers. Its theme song "Life Is The Name Of The Game" was written and sung by Forsyth, and later released on record.

1978–1982: Larry Grayson era
By the mid-1970s, desperate to end the BBC's long-running ratings success on a Saturday night, London Weekend Television offered Forsyth a chance to change channel to host The Big Night. Alan Boyd, producer of The Generation Game at the time, remembers that there were many proposals as to who should take over, with Bill Cotton having a brief discussion with his favoured choice Cilla Black, who would not consider the move; other names mentioned included Jimmy Tarbuck and Kenneth Williams. However, he felt he did not want the new programme to be comparable to Forsyth's Generation Game (he did not want the audience to be able to compare the two shows to think that Bruce was better or that the new host was better), so he cast Larry Grayson to take over. The show was given a new theme tune, which incorporated Grayson's "shut that door" catchphrase. There was also new scenery, and a new co-host, Isla St Clair. It worked, as The Big Night failed to beat The Generation Game and was off the air within three months.

The show reached its peak under Grayson. It attracted an audience of 25 million on one occasion, when a strike blacked out the ITV network, meaning the two BBC channels were the only ones the public could watch. Grayson's apparent incompetence and inability to remember what was going on was carefully contrived. In 1980 a junior version was considered, to be titled The Younger Generation Game, with two young siblings of different ages in place of older contestants. It was not confirmed whether Grayson would have hosted this proposed spin-off version, and it ultimately was never commissioned.

Cancellation
By the early 1980s The Generation Game was being beaten by ITV's hugely successful Game for a Laugh, which had been commissioned by LWT's Head of Light Entertainment Alan Boyd, who had been Grayson's producer for his first three seasons, but had defected to ITV. The show continued through to the end of 1981, but shortly after a highlights episode from the last series aired on 3 January 1982, Grayson decided to quit whilst the show was still popular. The BBC approached Jimmy Tarbuck to present the show but he turned it down. The show was later cancelled.

1990–2002 revival: Second Bruce Forsyth era and Jim Davidson
The Generation Game returned in 1990 with the original host, Bruce Forsyth, who after moving to ITV in 1995 was replaced by Jim Davidson. This incarnation was axed in 2002 after again being beaten by ITV, this time by Pop Idol. Davidson had announced in March that he was quitting the show. The series ended the following month.

Later revivals

2003–2005: Paul O'Grady pilots and Graham Norton special
The BBC were planning on reviving the show with Paul O'Grady as its new presenter in 2004. Filming two non-broadcast pilot episodes in 2003, both O'Grady and the production team were unhappy with the result, with O'Grady leaving the project. Graham Norton hosted a one-off special at Christmas 2005 featuring celebrity contestants Kelly Holmes, Davina McCall, Rupert Grint and James Fleet - this was titled "Generation Fame". At the time it was widely suggested that this was being treated as the pilot for a potential series; however, only the one edition has to date been screened.

2007 retrospective
The Generation Game returned in 2007 under the title Brucie's Generation Game: Now and Then broadcast on UKTV Gold. This version was a retrospective of earlier editions, similar to the digital channel's Wogan and Jim'll Fix It revivals around the same time.

2011: David Walliams's 24 Hour Panel People
In 2011, a version of the show featured as part of David Walliams's 24 Hour Panel People—a charity marathon of game shows for Comic Relief. David Walliams competed with his mother Kathleen. The other team consisted of Miranda Hart and Patricia Hodge, who play mother and daughter in the sitcom Miranda. Vernon Kay presented the episode.

2014–2015: Miranda Hart discussions
On 20 April 2014, it was announced that comedian Miranda Hart (who appeared on the 2011 charity special) was in "early talks" with the BBC about hosting a revived version of the show. A pilot episode was filmed before Christmas that year but the controller of the channel, Charlotte Moore, revealed in August 2015 that the project was "very much on hold" due to Hart wanting to concentrate on her acting and writing career.

2017–2018: Mel and Sue
On 11 May 2017, it was reported that Mel and Sue were linked to host a reboot for the BBC as part of a package for not staying with The Great British Bake Off after its move to Channel 4. On 23 July 2017, it was confirmed that Mel and Sue would host. However, on 7 February 2018, two episodes instead of the planned four were confirmed, with the BBC saying "During the production process it's not unusual for a new series to change length as the format evolves".

The first episode aired on BBC One on 1 April 2018. It received generally poor reviews from TV critics. Gerard O'Donovan from The Telegraph gave it one star, writing: "...There's little to say other than that it was a shameless carbon copy of memorable moments from The Generation Game of the 1970s or 80s." Carol Midgley of The Times gave it two stars, saying: "It needs to relax and dial down the gush. Brucie made it look so easy. Didn't he do well?" The i Paper's Jeff Robinson said the show "felt forced and scripted, another territory for the Mel and Sue brand to colonise post-Bake Off rather than an original updating of an old format." Sam Wollaston of The Guardian was more positive, giving it three stars and writing: "Somehow, it manages to be both a little bit glorious and groansome to the max at the same time."

Catchphrases

The show introduced a number of catchphrases, including Bruce Forsyth's "Didn't he/she/they do well?", "Let's meet the eight who are going to generate" and "Let's have a look at the old scoreboard".  Later, when the show was revived, Forsyth's assistant was Rosemarie Ford, so the catchphrase was amended to "What's on the board, Miss Ford?" (originally "What have they scored, Miss Ford?"). Forsyth always opened the show with "Good evening Ladies Gentlemen and Children welcome to the Generation Game, it's Nice to see you, to see you ..." to which the audience would shout "Nice!", a catchphrase that Forsyth retained in his later television appearances. Others included "Good game, good game," "I hope you're playing this at home," and "Give us a twirl," which was said to hostess Anthea Redfern to show off her dress.

Grayson supplied his own catchphrases, including "Shut that door!", "What a gay day!" and "Seems like a nice boy!" Scores were preceded by "What are the scores on the doors?" to which St Clair would reply "The names in the frames say..." before announcing them.  After the conveyor belt finale, Grayson would say "What a lot you've got... you have got a lot!" but he abandoned this after his second season as it did not register with the public. Grayson and St Clair apparently had a strong bond; Grayson always introduced her at the start of each show as "my lovely Isla" and "my favourite girl, my Saturday girl."  She once referred to them as being "like a couple of naughty sisters."

Jim Davidson would later present but no real catchphrases were used; however, he made a running gag acknowledging this and tried out several 'potential catchphrases'.

Hostesses
Each host of The Generation Game was joined by a female hostess, who brought the contestants on stage, handed out the prizes and often joined in the games. The first was Anthea Redfern, who began an affair with host Forsyth and married him during the series' run. When she was absent on maternity leave, actress Jenny Lee Wright stood in for a number of shows. Isla St. Clair was Grayson's hostess throughout his tenure on the show. Rosemarie Ford supported Forsyth on his second stint as host. Sally Meen, Melanie Stace and Lea Christiansen were Davidson's hostesses.

Merchandise

Board games
In 1975, Strawberry Fayre and Denys Fisher published a board game (simply called Generation Game with host Bruce Forsyth on the cover) featuring a three-dimensional diorama of the set, a working countdown clock and the famous sliding doors.

In 1990, Rainbow Games published another board game (only this time as Bruce Forsyth's Generation Game still with Forsyth on the cover).

Books
In 1992, a book called Bruce Forsyth's Generation Game Book: Games, Quizzes, and D-I-Y (Do It Yourself) Fun for All the Family was published by Vermillion. Where it takes the reader on an intriguing behind-the-scenes tour in this book of the programme. Also included is a varied selection of the best games, quizzes and DIY ideas which have been featured on the show including how to do the ballroom dance, make an origami butterfly, identify unusual objects and guess the celebrity in disguise.

International versions
In addition to the original Dutch version and long-running British version, Rudi Carrell hosted the German version  from 1974 to 1979 on Das Erste. There was also a Swedish version, Tjocka Släkten, presented by Lasse Berghagen and Inga Gill from 1990 to 1991. In 2008 a South African version of the show was made, hosted by comedian Barry Hilton together with actress/presenter Cindy Nkabinde on channel SABC 2.

In popular culture
 In the third Harry Potter film, during the dinner scene with the Dursleys, Dudley Dursley is watching this show on television.
 In the 1993 UK top 40 single "You're in a Bad Way" by Saint Etienne, a reference is made to someone who gets their "kicks watching Bruce on the old Generation Game".
 DI Alex Drake briefly watches Larry Grayson's The Generation Game at the start of episode 1.3 of Ashes to Ashes.
In the "Victorian inventions" song near the end of an episode of Horrible Histories, a conveyor belt is going along and a teddy bear is on it (although stating it was made in 1902, the year after Victoria died).
 Pink Floyd guitarist David Gilmour was well known for wearing a T-shirt with the catchphrase "Didn't They Do Well" on stage in the 70s. Although he no longer wears the shirt the bass player in his band, Guy Pratt, can often be seen wearing a similar shirt.

Transmissions

Original

Bruce Forsyth

Series

Specials

Larry Grayson

Series

Specials

Revival

Bruce Forsyth

Series

Specials

Jim Davidson

Series

Specials

Graham Norton

Specials

Mel and Sue

Series

References

External links

1971 British television series debuts
2018 British television series endings
1970s British game shows
1980s British game shows
1990s British game shows
2000s British game shows
2010s British game shows
BBC television game shows
BBC high definition shows
English-language television shows
Television series featuring gunge
Television series by BBC Studios
British television series revived after cancellation